Wooldridge is a village in northeastern Cooper County, Missouri, United States. The population was 61 at the 2010 census. On October 22, 2022 a large fire destroyed 23 buildings, about half the town.

History
Wooldridge was laid out in 1901. The village was named for Dr. Wooldridge, the original owner of the town site. A post office called Wooldridge has been in operation since 1902.

Geography
Wooldridge is located on Missouri Route 179 in the northeast corner of Cooper County. The Missouri River floodplain lies adjacent to the northeast side of the community. Boonville lies approximately eleven miles to the northwest. Columbia is nine miles to the northeast in adjacent Boone County.

Demographics

2010 census
As of the census of 2010, there were 61 people, 32 households, and 15 families living in the village. The racial makeup of the village was 96.7% White, 1.6% Native American, and 1.6% from other races. Hispanic or Latino of any race were 11.5% of the population.

There were 32 households, of which 21.9% had children under the age of 18 living with them, 25.0% were married couples living together, 15.6% had a female householder with no husband present, 6.3% had a male householder with no wife present, and 53.1% were non-families. 50.0% of all households were made up of individuals. The average household size was 1.91 and the average family size was 2.80.

The median age in the village was 42.8 years. 18% of residents were under the age of 18; 13.2% were between the ages of 18 and 24; 19.7% were from 25 to 44; 46% were from 45 to 64; and 3.3% were 65 years of age or older. The gender makeup of the village was 47.5% male and 52.5% female.

2000 census
As of the census of 2000, there were 47 people, 18 households, and 10 families living in the village. The population density was 761.3 people per square mile (302.4/km). There were 21 housing units at an average density of 340.1 per square mile (135.1/km). The racial makeup of the village was 97.87% White, and 2.13% from two or more races.

There were 18 households, out of which 38.9% had children under the age of 18 living with them, 44.4% were married couples living together, 11.1% had a female householder with no husband present, and 38.9% were non-families. 27.8% of all households were made up of individuals, and 5.6% had someone living alone who was 65 years of age or older. The average household size was 2.61 and the average family size was 3.18.

In the village, the population was spread out, with 27.7% under the age of 18, 10.6% from 18 to 24, 34.0% from 25 to 44, 25.5% from 45 to 64, and 2.1% who were 65 years of age or older. The median age was 32 years. For every 100 females, there were 113.6 males. For every 100 females age 18 and over, there were 100.0 males.

The median income for a household in the village was $45,000, and the median income for a family was $45,938. Males had a median income of $25,000 versus $22,500 for females. The per capita income for the village was $13,781. There were 15.4% of families and 29.6% of the population living below the poverty line, including 42.1% of under eighteens and none of those over 64.

References

Villages in Cooper County, Missouri
Villages in Missouri